Eby could refer to:

Places
Eby, Indiana, a town
Eby, West Virginia

People

 Benjamin Eby, a Mennonite bishop and the founder of Ebytown, which later became the city of Kitchener, Ontario
 Betsy Eby, American painter
 Byron Eby, American football player
 David Eby, 37th Premier of British Columbia
 Earl Eby, American athlete
 Eby-Brown, American company
 Kerr Eby, Canadian illustrator
 Martin K. Eby, Jr.

Other uses
Eby Shoe Corporation buildings

Surnames of Swiss origin
Swiss-language surnames